Côr Godre'r Aran (English: Choir from the foothills of the Aran mountain) is a Welsh male-voice choir that from Llanuwchllyn, near Bala, North Wales. The choir has in excess of 40 members who represent a spectrum of rural occupations and is unique in that all members are natural Welsh speakers.

History
The choir was formed in 1949 to compete at the National Eisteddfod of Wales in Dolgellau by the late Tom Jones. It was at that time a penillion singing or cerdd dant group of about 20 young men from the village of Llanuwchllyn. The choir soon gained a strong reputation as one of the chief exponents of this traditional Welsh genre. However when Eirian Owen succeeded to the role of musical director, she transformed the choir into a highly professional and disciplined outfit, without losing any of its original spirit.

The choir has travelled extensively since 1969 and has performed in the United States, New Zealand, Portugal, Hong Kong, Singapore, Tazmania, Argentina, Canada on three occasions, and Australia eight times. Their recent overseas trip saw them return to the regions of Patagonia, Argentina for a three-week tour in November and to Switzerland. Other short tours have taken the choir to Spain, Switzerland, Ireland, Scotland and the Royal Albert Hall, London; Symphony Hall, Birmingham; The Sage, Gateshead; Brangwyn Hall, Swansea; and St David's Hall, Cardiff.

Their musical director is Eirian Owen, a gifted musician and accompanist who has directed the choir since 1975. She was appointed accompanist of Côr Godre’r Aran in 1970 and subsequently succeeded Tom Jones as musical director. Over the years she has voluntarily devoted hours to the Choir and has been instrumental in developing and directing the choir to its success.

Discography
The choir has recorded 12 times with Welsh record company SAIN including four CD's - Evviva, Cwlwm Aur, Byd o Heddwch and Cofio which was released on the choir's 60th anniversary in 2009.

Awards
Over the years the choir has successfully competed at National and International levels winning the principle awards at the National Eisteddfod of Wales & the Llangollen International Eisteddfod. In 2005, the choir won the BBC Radio Cymru competition for Male Voice choirs.

The choir is regarded as one of the finest male voice choir in the world, with several National Eisteddfod of Wales Blue Ribbon (Gwobr Goffa David Ellis) winners members of the choir including twice winner, the baritone Tom Evans (also known as Tom Gwanas). and most recent winner Erfyl Tomos Jones.

References

External links
Côr Godre'r Aran

Boys' and men's choirs
Musical groups established in 1949
Welsh choirs
1949 establishments in Wales